The Golden Globe Award for Best Supporting Actress – Series, Miniseries, or Television Film is an award presented annually by the Hollywood Foreign Press Association (HFPA). It is the Golden Globe Award given in honor of an actress who has delivered an outstanding performance in a supporting role on a television series, miniseries or motion picture made for television for the calendar year. The award was first presented at the 28th Golden Globe Awards on February 5, 1971, to Gail Fisher for her role in Mannix. It was presented under the title Best Supporting Actress – Television Series before changing to its current title in 1980. Starting with the 80th Golden Globe Awards, the category has been split into two categories: Comedy/Drama Series and Limited or Anthology Series or Television Film.

Since its inception, the award has been given to 49 actresses. Jennifer Coolidge and Julia Garner are the current recipients of the awards for their respective portrayals of Tanya McQuoid in The White Lotus and Ruth Langmore in Ozark. Valerie Bertinelli, Laura Dern, Faye Dunaway, and Polly Holliday have all won the most awards in this category with two each. Rhea Perlman has been nominated for the award on six occasions, the most within the category; she lost all six times.

Winners and nominees
Listed below are the winners of the award for each year, as well as the other nominees:

Best Supporting Actress – Television Series

1970s

Best Supporting Actress – Series, Miniseries, or Television Film

1980s

1990s

2000s

2010s

2020s

Superlatives

Multiple wins

Multiple nominations

See also
 TCA Award for Individual Achievement in Drama
 TCA Award for Individual Achievement in Comedy
 Primetime Emmy Award for Outstanding Supporting Actress in a Drama Series
 Critics' Choice Television Award for Best Supporting Actress in a Drama Series
 Primetime Emmy Award for Outstanding Supporting Actress in a Comedy Series
 Critics' Choice Television Award for Best Supporting Actress in a Comedy Series
 Critics' Choice Television Award for Best Supporting Actress in a Movie/Miniseries
 Screen Actors Guild Award for Outstanding Performance by a Female Actor in a Drama Series
 Screen Actors Guild Award for Outstanding Performance by a Female Actor in a Comedy Series
 Primetime Emmy Award for Outstanding Supporting Actress in a Limited or Anthology Series or Movie
 Screen Actors Guild Award for Outstanding Performance by a Female Actor in a Miniseries or Television Movie

References

Golden Globe Awards
 
Television awards for Best Supporting Actress